Cutlass is a short drama film which was filmed in 2007, written and directed by Kate Hudson.

Plot
Lacy (Dakota Fanning), a young songwriter, discovers a great but expensive guitar in a music shop. She's very excited by the guitar, and asks her mother, Robin (Virginia Madsen), to buy it. However, her mom says "absolutely not", but after that she reminiscences about the time back in 1979 when she got an Olds Cutlass as her first car. Her father used to say: "Whatever makes you happy, makes me happy". Maybe... in the end... she'll change her mind about Lacy's wish.

Cast

References

External links
 

2007 films
2007 drama films
American drama short films
2007 short films
Films set in 1979
2000s English-language films
2000s American films